Bordils is a village in the province of Girona in Catalonia, an autonomous community of Spain.

References

External links
 Government data pages 

Municipalities in Gironès